Monte Kristo was a French Italo disco band of the 1980s, known primarily for their debut single "Girl of Lucifer", which reached #8 on French music charts.

Discography

Singles

Albums 
 Lady Valentine (1989)

References

External links 
 
 Monte Kristo at Discopedia 
 Members
 
 

Italo disco groups
French pop music groups